Arturo Segovia (born 26 October 1941) is a Colombian footballer. He played in 15 matches for the Colombia national football team from 1967 to 1977. He was also part of Colombia's squad for the 1975 Copa América tournament.

References

1941 births
Living people
Colombian footballers
Colombia international footballers
Place of birth missing (living people)
Association football defenders
Deportes Tolima footballers
Atlético Junior footballers
América de Cali footballers
Millonarios F.C. players